The 2013 J.League Cup, also known as the 2013 J.League Yamazaki Nabisco Cup for sponsoring purposes, was the 38th edition of the most prestigious Japanese soccer league cup tournament and the 21st edition under the current J.League Cup format.

Format
Teams from the J.League Division 1 will take part in the tournament. Kashiwa Reysol, Sanfrecce Hiroshima, Urawa Red Diamonds and Vegalta Sendai were given a bye to the quarter-finals due to qualification in the 2013 AFC Champions League. The remaining 14 teams started from the group stage, where they were divided into two groups of seven. The group winners and the runners-up of each group qualified for the quarter-final along with the four teams which qualified for the AFC Champions League.

Group stage

Standings

Group A

Group B

Results

Group A

Group B

Knock-out stage
All times are Japan Standard Time (UTC+9)

Quarter-finals

First leg

Second leg

Semi-finals

First leg

Second leg

Final

Goalscorers

References

See also

J.League Cup
Lea